Adriaen is a Dutch form of Adrian. Notable people with the name include:

Adriaen Banckert (1615–1684), Dutch admiral
Adriaen Block (1567–1627), Dutch private trader and navigator
Adriaen Brouwer (1605–1638), Flemish genre painter
Adriaen de Vries (1556–1626), Northern Mannerist sculptor born in the Netherlands
Adriaen Hanneman (1603–1671), seventeenth-century Dutch painter
Adriaen Isenbrandt (1480–1551), Flemish Northern Renaissance painter
Adriaen Maertensz Block (1582–1661), successively captain, commander, and governor of the Ambon Island
Adriaen van Bergen devised the plot to recapture the city of Breda from the Spanish during the Eighty Years' War
Adriaen van de Velde (1636–1672), Dutch animal and landscape painter
Adriaen van de Venne (1589–1662), versatile Dutch Baroque painter
Adriaen van der Cabel (1631–1705), Dutch painter of the Dutch school
Adriaen van der Donck (1618–1655), lawyer and landowner in New Netherland
Adriaen van der Werff (1659–1722), accomplished Dutch painter
Adriaen van Nieulandt the younger (1587–1658), Dutch painter and engraver
Adriaen van Ostade (1610–1685), Dutch genre painter
Adriaen van Utrecht (1599–1652), Flemish Baroque still life painter

Dutch masculine given names